Edmundo Farolán (d. Jan. 29, 2023) is a Filipino-Canadian author. He won literary awards as a young writer-scholar while studying philosophy and letters in Madrid in the 1960s. He taught English, Spanish, and Media in various universities, including Webster University Thailand, University of Silesia (Czech Republic), Dalian University (China), University of Toronto, University of Alberta and Corpus Christi College.

Farolan obtained his bachelor's degree from Ateneo de Manila University, Licenciatura (Cand.) from the Universidad Central de Madrid, a master's degree in Hispanic Studies from the University of Toronto and a Ph.D in Speech Communication from Bowling Green State University . He has acted professionally and directed for the Vancouver Actors' Theater and the Vancouver Experimental Theatre. He is the founding editor of an arts and entertainment e-zine, ReviewVancouver, and Revista Filipina He is the recipient of the Premio Zobel in 1982, the Philippines' highest literary honor given to Filipinos writing in Spanish. As a leading authority in Spanish literature and language, he is a senior correspondent for the Real Academia de la Lengua Española in the Philippines. He has published several books of poetry, anthologies, textbooks and translations.  He was published in Reflexiones Sobre el Primer Congreso Internacional de la Lengua Española as well as other books and articles in Spanish and English.

From 2002 to 2012, he lectured at the Université de Bretagne Occidentale (France), Ateneo Obrero de Gijón (Spain), University of Oulu (Finland), TU Dresden (Germany), Donetsk Academy (Ukraine), la Universidad Catolica del Norte (Chile), Thompson Rivers University and Royal Roads University.

Works

Lluvias Filipinas (1967)
The Rhythm of Despair (1974)
Gramatica y Practica (1979)
Don Segundo Sombra: traduccion tagala (1979)
Literatura filhispana: una antologia (1980)
Espanol para universitarios filipinos (1981)
Tercera Primavera (1981)
Oh Canada (1994)
2000 versos (2000)
Media and Culture (2003)
Religions and Intercultural Reciprocity (2004)
Intercultural Communication (2005) 
Itinerancias: Comings and Goings(2006)
64 Solitudes (2008)
Love, Travels and other Memoirs of a Filipino Writer (2009)
Cuentos hispanofilipinos (2010)
Hexalogia Teatral (2011)
New Poems (2015–present)
El diario de Frankie Aguinaldo (2016)
Soledades (2017)
Poems (2017)
Bowling Green Chronicles 1972/73 (2017)
Antonio Martinez Ballesteros and the Underground Theatre of Protest in Spain (2017)
Novel: Novel II (2017)
Johnny, Jimmy and Joey in Klamath Falls and other stories (2017)
A Death in Tianjin and other stories (2017)
Rizal (2017)
Memoirs (2017)
Metamorfosis: una anti-novela (2018)
Six Short Essays (2019)
Purgatorio (2019) 
The Passion and Death of Jesus Christ (2019) 
Palali: A Screenplay(2020)
Fools and other plays (2020)
An Nth Stream of Consciousness and other poems (2020)
Cañon at iba pang mga tula (2020) 
Transcience and other poems (2021) 
Aguinaldo(2021) 
The Loser and other stories(2022)

References

 E. Farolan en Gijon
 Edmundo Farolán author details

1943 births
Ateneo de Manila University alumni
University of Toronto alumni
Bowling Green State University alumni
Living people
Canadian male poets
Filipino emigrants to Canada
Canadian writers of Asian descent
Canadian male non-fiction writers
Spanish-language writers of the Philippines
20th-century Canadian translators
20th-century Canadian poets
20th-century Canadian male writers
21st-century Canadian translators
21st-century Canadian male writers
21st-century Canadian poets